The Dorobanțu Wind Farm is wind farm located in Constanța County, Romania. It has 15 Vestas-V90 wind turbines with a nominal output of around 3 MW each.  It delivers up to 45 MW of power, enough to power over 30,000 homes, which required  a capital investment of approximately €90 million.

References

Wind farms in Romania